Perdita (Italian for "loss", from Latin for "lost woman"), may refer to:

People
Perdita Barran, English chemist
Perdita Buchan (born 1940), Anglo-American author
Perdita Felicien (born 1980), Canadian track athlete
Perdita Huston (1936–2001), American women's rights activist
Perdita Stevens (born 1966), British mathematician and computer scientist
Perdita Weeks (born 1985), English actress

Science
Perdita (genus), a genus of North American native bees
Perdita (moon), a minor satellite of the planet Uranus

Fiction
Perdita (The Winter's Tale), the heroine of Shakespeare's play The Winter's Tale
Perdita Boyte, a character from the 1936 novel And Berry Came Too by Dornford Yates
Perdita Hyde-Sinclair, a character from the British soap opera Emmerdale
Perdita Nitt, aka Agnes Nitt, character in the Witches subset of Terry Pratchett’s Discworld series
Perdita Willoughby-Lloyd, a minor character from the TV series The Haunting of Bly Manor
Queen Perdita of Vlatava, a character of the animated superhero series Young Justice
Perdita, a female Dalmatian dog in The Hundred and One Dalmatians, a 1956 children's novel by Dodie Smith, and films, stage productions, and games based on the novel; see 101 Dalmatians (disambiguation)

Other
Perdita (horse) (foaled 1881), English thoroughbred

See also